{{family name hatnote|Basrewan (Indonesian Hadhrami patronymic surname)}}

Karina Fariza Ambrosini Basrewan (born March 13, 1996) is an Indonesian news anchor, model and beauty pageant titleholder. She is crowned as Miss Earth Indonesia 2022 and representing Indonesia at the Miss Earth 2022 pageant in the Philippines, where she won the Best National Costume'' special award but failed to reach the Top 20.

Early life and education 
Karina Basrewan was born on 13 March 1996. Her father was Faroek Ambrosini Basrewan, an Hadhrami-Javanese businessman originated from Malang, East Java. Her mother is Kristina Basrewan, a Klaten's Javanese. She is the only child in the family.

Karina spent almost her entire childhood and teenage years in Jakarta where she finished her international baccalaureate diploma at the
British School Jakarta. In 2015, she moved to Australia to pursue her higher education at the University of Melbourne and finished her degree in communication and media studies 3 years later.

Pageantry

Puteri Indonesia 2018
She won her first pageant, Puteri Indonesia DKI Jakarta 6, competed in Puteri Indonesia 2018, and was placed in the top 11.

Miss Earth Indonesia 2022
On 22 September 2022, was appointed to be Miss Earth Indonesia 2022 by Mahakarya Duta Pesona Indonesia organization, and represented Indonesia at the Miss Earth 2022 pageant.

Miss Earth 2022
As the winner of Miss Earth Indonesia 2022, she represented Indonesia at the 22nd edition of the Miss Earth competition at Okada Manila in the Philippines, on November 13, 2022. At the finale she won the Best National Costume special award.

Television Programs
Basrewan has presented several variety talk shows and news programs.

Talk show

References 

 

1996 births
Living people
Miss Earth 2022 contestants
University of Melbourne alumni
Indonesian female models
Indonesian beauty pageant winners
People from Jakarta
Javanese people